Peter Alfred Charles Pokai (born 24 August 1965) is a New Zealand former professional basketball player. He played in the National Basketball League (NBL) and competed for the New Zealand Tall Blacks at the 1986 FIBA World Championship and 2000 Summer Olympics.

Early life
As a youth, Pokai played basketball and rugby league. He attended Upper Hutt College in Upper Hutt.

NBL career
Pokai debuted in the NBL in 1988 and won a championship with the Wellington Saints. He played four seasons for the Hutt Valley Lakers between 1990 and 1993. In 1991, Pokai won the NBL Most Outstanding Kiwi Forward/Centre Award and helped Hutt Valley win the NBL championship. In 1993, he helped Hutt Valley win their second title in three years after hitting the game-winning jumper in the final.

After a season with the Otago Nuggets in 1994, Pokai played for Wellington between 1995 and 1997. In 1998, he joined the Nelson Giants. After two seasons with Nelson, he played for the Saints again in 2000 and 2001.

In April 2021, Pokai was ranked the 16th best player in the NBL's 40-year history.

Personal life
Pokai has a brother named Matthew. As of 2021, Pokai was living in Australia.

References

External links
1999 Nelson Giants player profile
Basketball-reference.com profile
FIBA Archive profile

1965 births
Living people
Basketball players at the 2000 Summer Olympics
Centers (basketball)
New Zealand men's basketball players
Olympic basketball players of New Zealand
Sportspeople from Wellington City
1986 FIBA World Championship players